CrazySexyCool: The TLC Story is a 2013 American biographical television film about the R&B and hip hop musical trio TLC. It derives its title from the title of the group's second album, CrazySexyCool. The film stars Keke Palmer as Rozonda "Chilli" Thomas, Niatia "Lil Mama" Kirkland as Lisa "Left Eye" Lopes and Drew Sidora as Tionne "T-Boz" Watkins. The film was directed by Charles Stone III and written by Kate Lanier. Thomas and Watkins also served as executive producers of the film.

The film premiered on VH1 on October 21, 2013. TLC released a compilation album, 20, released by LaFace and Epic Records on October 15, 2013, marking both the band's 20-plus year in entertainment business and the release of CrazySexyCool: The TLC Story which largely inspired the track listing for 20. Next to their four number-one singles "Creep", "Waterfalls", "No Scrubs" and "Unpretty" plus a new track written by singer Ne-Yo, "Meant to Be".

The film's premiere generated 4.5 million viewers, making it the highest-rated television film premiere of 2013, as well as the highest-rated original film premiere in VH1 history.

The film was released on DVD on October 21, 2014.

Plot
The film begins with Tionne Watkins narrating about the girls' lives as children, and summarizing their story. The film then jumps to the year 1990 in Atlanta, Georgia. Tionne, after being rejected from an all-male street dance crew despite impressing the crowd at a rollerskating center, is approached by her friend, Marie, who informs her about a girl group being formed by Ian Burke and persuades her to audition for LaFace Records. Tionne, although reluctant, brings Crystal Jones, the founder of the group, to meet her rapper friend Lisa Lopes and see her perform, and Crystal says that she will be perfect for the group. After singing "Meeting in the Ladies Room", they receive a mixed reception, mostly in part due to Crystal's ill-fated actual performance. However, both Tionne and Lisa garner interest from both Perri "Pebbles" Reid and her husband, co-founder of LaFace Antonio "L.A." Reid. After receiving the good news from both Pebbles and L.A., Lisa decides to call her family in Philadelphia and tell them the great news, especially her father, who told her that she would never make it as a rapper. She calls her family only to learn that her father has been shot and killed, which causes her to begin drinking heavily in her grief.

The film jumps ahead to a dance class in 1991 where Damian Dame backup dancer Rozonda Thomas participates. Rozonda sees Pebbles walk in and talk to her teacher. When she asks one of the other girls why Pebbles is there and learns about Pebbles looking for another girl for a girl group, Rozonda rushes over and immediately talks to Pebbles. When her dance teacher tries to shoo her away, she starts singing, amazing everyone listening. Pebbles brings Rozonda to meet Lisa, Tionne, and music producer Dallas Austin, who is Tionne's longtime friend. The girls become fast friends and at their audition, where they perform "What About Your Friends", L.A. gives them the green light to cut their first video and record. However, Pebbles points out a naming problem as she intended to call the group TLC after Tionne, Lisa, and Crystal; and Rozonda is rechristened "Chilli" for the group at Lisa's suggestion. Pebbles also envisions the girls wearing high-heels and skirts, but Tionne affirms their preference for baggy clothes and dancing, to which Pebbles concedes but warns the girls they have to work hard in order to succeed. After the audition, Chilli asks Tionne about Dallas, and she states that he is a player - a non-committal man who has flings with several women.

Pebbles takes the girls out to lunch to sign the contracts, telling them that they have a weekly stipend of $25.00 and will only get paid when they have sold records and tickets to shows. The girls are given studio sessions, where Pebbles forces the girls to do sections of their dance routines repeatedly to get them right. During the rehearsal, Pebbles notices Chilli seeing Dallas, who is producing some tracks for the album, and Lisa complains she is hungry whilst cursing. She pulls all the girls aside and tells them that they will not swear or be loose, which seems to offend them, but they get back to work. Pebbles later leaves the girls during a studio session to attend a meeting. She tells Dallas to keep the girls working, but instead, a fun food fight breaks out between the girls and Dallas. Dallas chases Chilli into one of the sound booths and proceeds to kiss her. After re-entering the studio, Pebbles sees the two lip-locked lovers and begins to reprimand the girls and Dallas for their behavior. After docking the girls two weeks' pay, she suspends Chilli from the group and insists on holding auditions to see if there is another singer who fits her vision, despite Tionne and Lisa both telling her that they want Chilli to stay.

While Tionne and Lisa sit through a day of bad auditions, an upset Chilli is with Dallas, who comforts her by kissing her, which leads to them having sex. After Pebbles decides to let Chilli stay in the group, Lisa and Tionne call Chilli to tell her the news. Right after Chilli gets that call, she looks down at a positive pregnancy test that she has just taken. She tells Dallas that she is uncertain what to do, despite her desire to be a mother, and Dallas says that he will support her in whatever decision she makes. Chilli decides to get an abortion in order to save her fragile career. Tionne and Lisa come to visit Chilli after the operation to cheer her up. After Chilli has recovered, they are seen working on their first music video for their song "Ain't 2 Proud 2 Beg" from their debut album, Ooooooohhh... On the TLC Tip. During the video shoot, Chilli begins to suspect that Dallas is cheating on her when she sees him talking to another girl. Later in a car, Lisa proposes that they do a video and an album with a futuristic theme, but Tionne says that they should wait until they get recognized. The girls are then ecstatic when they hear "What About Your Friends" on the radio for the first time.

The girls begin their first nationwide tour as an opening act for MC Hammer in 1992, and their first concert is met with rousing acclaim from the stadium audience. Midway through the successful tour, during which their album and singles also sell well, the girls learn that they will only get paid once the label is reimbursed for the costs spent on them, and ask Pebbles if they can review their initial contracts. A hurt Pebbles, who thinks that the girls do not trust her, storms out, so they decide to wait before pursuing the matter any further. Backstage following a concert, Chilli eyes Dallas talking to yet another girl, arousing her suspicions, and Tionne collapses on the floor and is taken to the hospital. A doctor informs Lisa, Chilli, and Pebbles that Tionne's collapse was due to a crisis from her sickle cell anemia, a fact previously unknown to them, and she needs two weeks to recover, resulting in several canceled shows. Tionne's mother complains to the doctor about not being given reassurance on the ongoing prognosis, but Tionne says that as long as she is living her childhood dream of performing in front of thousands of people, she will be okay.

After the girls return home from their tour, they receive their platinum records for 1 million copies sold of their album, and they receive their brand new cars but still wonder where the rest of the money is. They go to their attorney so that they can go over their contracts, only to find out that their attorney works for Pebbles. The attorney tells them that L.A. has all their money, and they are only to get a stipend while the rest goes into an account so that they do not spend it all. They talk to L.A. and tell him that they do not want Pebbles on their second album because they want more artistic freedom. L.A. tells them that since Pebbles owns the trademarks and copyrights of the name TLC, they will either have to buy her out or change their name. They decide to buy her out in order to achieve the creative freedom that they need.

In 1993, the girls begin working on their second album CrazySexyCool, believing that their new creative freedom will come with more rights to their money. When Chilli refuses to go on a night out with Tionne and Lisa to get some rest at home, the two go clubbing at a nearby nightclub. However, Lisa gets drunk and dances on top of the bar, and she hits the bar owner in the head with a champagne bottle when he tries to get her to stop, causing her to be banned from the club. Tionne takes her to a hotel, where she has a nervous breakdown about people taking things away from her. The same night, Chilli confronts Dallas for throwing a party at her house and not inviting her, but he calms her down by kissing her. The following day, Chilli admits to her mother that she is uncertain, saying she should not be with Dallas, but she cannot let him go. During the recording of "Diggin' on You", Tionne notices Dallas talking to another woman and scolds him for his behavior while he is still dating Chilli, who walks in, witnesses the confrontation, and sees the woman. During a night of clubbing with her friend, Lisa complains about a man watching her from afar. Her friend says that the man is Andre Rison, a wide receiver for the NFL's Atlanta Falcons. Andre walks up to Lisa, proclaiming that he is her biggest fan, and requests that she honor him with a dance, to which Lisa obliges. Later, as Lisa and her friend are leaving the club, Andre picks a reluctant Lisa up and carries her in his arms, and persuades her to come home with him. As they arrive at his house, Lisa asks him why there is no furniture inside; he says he was waiting for her, and they kiss passionately.

In 1994, Lisa moves in with Andre, and Chilli is horrified when another woman announces that she is pregnant with Dallas' child, so she pours her heartbreak into the recording of "Creep". Later that night, Lisa comes home and finds Andre cheating on her with another woman; she slams the woman against the wall, slaps him, and storms out. On June 8, 1994, Dallas arrives at Chilli's house to apologize to her, and they have sex. At the same time, Lisa and her friend notice newly-bought tennis shoes on her and Andre's bed. Realizing that Andre did not buy her any, she throws them in a bathtub and sets fire to them to get back at Andre. However, the fire quickly spreads and his entire house is burnt down, which makes the news. Lisa flees, and Tionne and Chilli find her in a forest, coming to terms with all that she has been through. Eventually, Lisa turns herself in to the police and is charged for first-degree arson and sentenced to five years of probation and a $10,000 fine. She spends time in rehab, and is only released during her stay for two recording sessions with Tionne and Chilli, during which she contributes an introspective rap verse to what will become the group's biggest hit, "Waterfalls", after seeing a rainbow on the way to the studio. During the video shoot for "Creep", Lisa complains to Tionne that no-one ever wants to do her futuristic idea and threatens to wear tape on her mouth, and Lisa and Chilli complain that they spoke with L.A. who has denied having control of their money and is urging them to speak to Clive Davis about the money. Tionne then urges them not to fixate on it, as she believes that getting rid of Pebbles is supposed to fix their problems in the first place.

In 1995, after receiving awards and other acknowledgements, they still do not see any money come in. At the 1996 Grammy Awards, they announce that they are broke because of greedy people at their record company. The film flashes back to 1995, where they complain to each other about only receiving $50,000 a year, whereas most people make more money than they do. So the girls band a group together to go storm the record label's building to speak with Clive, who is in the middle of a meeting with Sean Combs. Clive tells the girls that they will get the attorneys and the accountants in a meeting and see what the record label owes them. They are all cut small checks of $15,000, and Lisa reveals in an on-air radio interview that due to an unfair contract, the group owes $200,000 that they lack in order to pay back managers, lawyers, and damages that Pebbles is suing them for. The group then file for bankruptcy and find a new manager, Bill Diggins, who gives them a worldwide headlining tour, the Budweiser Fest Tour, and an improved profit margin after they record their next album.

In late 1996, following the tour, Chilli announces to Tionne and Lisa that she is pregnant with Dallas' baby. By 1997, the girls are recording their third album, FanMail, dedicated to their fans whose letters they have received, and Chilli gives birth to her and Dallas' son, Tron. In 1998, during a sickle-cell scare in hospital after being comforted by her mother, Tionne writes a poem dealing with a woman's struggle with her self-image and unrealistic concepts of beauty portrayed in the media, which Dallas helps her adapt into "Unpretty", an empowering song for the group's female fan base to overcome feelings of physical inadequacy. During the recording of "Unpretty", Chilli breaks up with Dallas, saying that even though they have a son together, they are still very different people, and they are not right for each other.

In October 1999, the girls are about to go on tour to support FanMail. However, by this time, friction between the girls has increased because Lisa is complaining to her new boyfriend Larry about Tionne and Chilli rejecting her ideas and apparently plagiarizing them, and she has challenged Tionne and Chilli to make their own solo albums in a bid to see who is the most successful member of the group. Following a confrontation between Tionne and Bill and Lisa and Larry before a scheduled appearance on TRL, during which Tionne reveals that Larry is married, Bill urges Lisa to resolve her issues with Tionne and Chilli before going on tour, or they will all fall back into bankruptcy.

In February 2000, Bill offers the girls ten shows in Europe for their tour the following week with estimated earnings of $25,000,000, which Tionne and Chilli are ecstatic about, but Lisa declines, stating that she is going to Honduras that week for spiritual healing and she is beginning work on her debut solo album. Later, while Lisa is in Honduras, Tionne learns in a hospital that she is pregnant with her first child and chooses to keep the baby, despite the risks for her and the baby. Shortly after, Bill urges the girls to do another album and another tour, but Tionne, due to her pregnancy, and Lisa, awaiting the release of her album Supernova, are reluctant. Later, Lisa learns that her record company is not releasing Supernova in the U.S. due to poor sales and reception overseas, so she has a nervous breakdown at the 2000 Grammy Awards. After she admits to Tionne and Chilli that she feels that the numbers are not aligning properly, they comfort her and urge her to go back to Honduras for more spiritual healing and work on her second solo album in addition to working with them on their next album. Tionne then gives birth to her daughter, Chase.

By early 2002, the group is recording their fourth album, 3D, with Tionne and Chilli adjusting to life as mothers with growing children and Lisa contributing raps to some of the songs before heading to Honduras. Lisa promises to record more songs with them when she gets back from Honduras and vows that there will be no more friction between them. However, on April 25, 2002, a devastated Tionne and Chilli learn that Lisa has been killed on impact in a car accident in La Ceiba, Honduras, while filming her documentary. During a radio interview, Tionne and Chilli vow always to stay together despite Lisa's death, although they are uncertain about the group's fate.

The film ends ten years later, with Tionne and Chilli reuniting in the studio to begin recording their next album. The film then transitions into real-life studio footage of Tionne and Chilli recording "Meant to Be" in the studio with singer-songwriter Ne-Yo, as vigils in the career of TLC play during the song.

Cast 
 Keke Palmer as Rozonda "Chilli" Thomas
 Hannah Cartwright as Young Chilli 
 Niatia "Lil Mama" Kirkland as Lisa "Left Eye" Lopes
Ariana Neal as Young Lisa
 Drew Sidora as Tionne "T-Boz" Watkins
Chase Rolison as Young Tionne
 Rochelle Aytes as Perri "Pebbles" Reid
 Evan Ross as Dallas Austin
 Carl Anthony Payne II as Antonio "L.A." Reid 
 Tasia Sherel as Ava Thomas, Chilli's mother
 Jim Coleman as Dr. Sebi
Shaun Clay as Sean "Puffy" Combs
Rico Ball as Andre Rison
 Ed Amatrudo as Clive Davis
Shervoski Couture as Choreographer
DeMontrez Spears as Dalvin DeGrate
Donny Boaz as Bill Diggins
Chantell D. Christopher as Gayle Watkins, T-Boz's mother
Brave Williams as Singer at Award show
Brooke Montalvo as Crystal Jones
Mary Shaw as Tionne's Doctor
Renell Gibbs as Larry (Marshall Lorenzo Martin)
Shamea Morton as Pregnant girl
Nadiyah Hollis as Bleached Weave Girl
Charles Walton as Radio Host
 Tionne "T-Boz" Watkins as herself (plus archive footage)
 Lisa "Left Eye" Lopes as herself (archive footage)
 Rozonda "Chilli" Thomas as herself (plus archive footage)
 Shaffer "Ne-Yo" Smith as himself

Critical reception
On Metacritic, CrazySexyCool: The TLC Story has a score of 57 based on 6 critics’ reviews.

Jon Caramanica of The New York Times wrote, “Director Charles Stone III ('Drumline') does an admirable job remaking old music videos almost note for note and synthesizing faux vintage footage of varying types into a visually dynamic whole,” but said the film gives disproportionate time to the group’s financial squabbles with their record label and not enough time to their accomplishments and accolades.

In a positive review, Brian Lowry of Variety write, “Few stories are more fraught with cliches than the rising actor/musician unprepared for the dizzying view from the top, but the project meshes neatly with VH1’s urban appeal.” He added, “the story and central players are intriguing enough that the combination of music and melodrama pretty well speaks for itself, without requiring much embellishment.”

Willa Paskin of Slate said while the film is “not a particularly well-constructed biopic, hopping from moment to moment like moviemaking was just a matter of checking scenes off a list…it does everything that Tionne 'T-Boz' Watkins and Rozonda 'Chilli' Thomas, the two surviving members of TLC, could ask for: It will absolutely convince you that TLC was amazing.” Paskin added “the movie nails TLC’s particular infectious, rambunctious spirit, their defining characteristic since they burst onto the scene in the early ’90s”, and that ”the three actresses playing TLC, who all bring more to the parts than just looking like them, nail [their] montage scenes and their vibe of deep, silly friendship.”

References

External links
 
 

2013 television films
2013 films
2013 biographical drama films
African-American biographical dramas
Biographical films about singers
Biographical television films
Cultural depictions of American women
Cultural depictions of hip hop musicians
Cultural depictions of pop musicians
Drama films based on actual events
Films about musical groups
Films directed by Charles Stone III
Films set in the 1990s
Films set in the 2000s
TLC (group)
Black people in art
American drama television films
2010s American films
2010s female buddy films
Films about girl groups